Robert Lester Blackwell (October 4, 1895 – October 11, 1918) was an American soldier who posthumously received the Medal of Honor during World War I. He was born in the vicinity of Hurdle Mills, in Person County, North Carolina, to James B. and Eugenia Blackwell. Robert's father was originally from nearby Orange County, and was a Confederate Civil War veteran; his mother died when he was young. Blackwell was raised on his family's farm, and entered the Army from Hurdle Mills.

Biography
He was born on October 4, 1895.

He was assigned to Company K, 119th Infantry, 30th Division. He was one of two soldiers from North Carolina to be awarded the Medal of Honor for service in the First World War.

He is buried in Somme American Cemetery and Memorial, Somme Picardie, France. His grave can be found in plot D, row 20, grave 2. Robert's father received the medal May 6, 1919, from North Carolina Governor Thomas Bickett in a ceremony in the North Carolina State Capitol. The family later donated the medal to what is now the North Carolina Museum of History.

Honors
A statue to honor his heroism stands today in Roxboro, North Carolina, and shortly after World War I there was the Robert Lester Blackwell American Legion Post No. 138 in Roxboro, North Carolina.

Medal of Honor citation
Rank and organization: Private, U.S. Army, Company K, 119th Infantry, 30th Division. Place and date: Near St. Souplet, France, October 11, 1918. Entered service at: Hurdle Mills, N.C. Birth: Person County, N.C. G.O. No.: 13, W.D., 1919.

Citation:

When his platoon was almost surrounded by the enemy and his platoon commander asked for volunteers to carry a message calling for reinforcements, Pvt. Blackwell volunteered for this mission, well knowing the extreme danger connected with it. In attempting to get through the heavy shell and machinegun fire this gallant soldier was killed.

See also

List of Medal of Honor recipients
List of Medal of Honor recipients for World War I

References

External links

1895 births
1918 deaths
People from Person County, North Carolina
American military personnel killed in World War I
United States Army Medal of Honor recipients
United States Army soldiers
Recipients of the War Merit Cross (Italy)
Recipients of the Cruz de Guerra
Military personnel from North Carolina
World War I recipients of the Medal of Honor
Burials in Hauts-de-France